Gymnobela chrysopelex is a species of sea snail, a marine gastropod mollusk in the family Raphitomidae.

Description

Distribution
This marine species occurs off the Atlantic Cape Province, South Africa

References

 Barnard, Keppel Harcourt. Deep sea Mollusca from west of Cape Point, South Africa. South African Museum, 1963.

External links
 

Endemic fauna of South Africa
chrysopelex
Gastropods described in 1963